Yoo Hyun (born August 1, 1984) is a South Korean football player who currently plays for Suwon FC.

He was a member of 2005 East Asian Games's South Korea national football team. In 2007, he joined Korea National League's side Ulsan Hyundai Mipo Dockyard. He was awarded MVP in 2008 by the Korea National League.

In 2009, he moved to the newly formed Gangwon FC as a founding member with former Ulsan Hyundai Mipo Dockyard manager Choi Soon-Ho.

He left Gangwon for Incheon United in a straight swap deal involving Song Yoo-Geol on 28 November 2011. In January 2013 he joined Police FC in the new K League for the 2013 as part of his military service.

Honours

Club
Ulsan Hyundai Mipo Dockyard
Korea National League (2) : 2007, 2008
Korean President's Cup (1) : 2008

Individual
Korea National League MVP (1) : 2008

References

External links

 
 National League Player Record - 유현 

1984 births
Living people
Association football goalkeepers
South Korean footballers
Ulsan Hyundai Mipo Dockyard FC players
Gangwon FC players
Incheon United FC players
Ansan Mugunghwa FC players
FC Seoul players
Tochigi SC players
Korea National League players
K League 1 players
K League 2 players
J2 League players
Sportspeople from South Jeolla Province